Nico Braun (born 26 October 1950) is a Luxembourgish former professional footballer who played as a striker.

Club career
Braun played for foreign clubs almost all of his career, predominantly in France, but also in Germany, before returning to his original club, Union Luxembourg.

International career
A prolific striker at club level, Braun won 40 caps for Luxembourg over a period of ten years scoring eight goals.

References

External links
 
 
 

1950 births
Living people
Sportspeople from Luxembourg City
Luxembourgian footballers
Association football forwards
Luxembourg international footballers
Ligue 1 players
Bundesliga players
Belgian Pro League players
Union Luxembourg players
FC Schalke 04 players
FC Metz players
R. Charleroi S.C. players
Thionville FC players
Luxembourgian expatriate footballers
Luxembourgian expatriate sportspeople in West Germany
Expatriate footballers in West Germany
Luxembourgian expatriate sportspeople in France
Expatriate footballers in France
Luxembourgian expatriate sportspeople in Belgium
Expatriate footballers in Belgium